XHDC-FM is a radio station on 104.5 FM in Aguascalientes City, Aguascalientes. The station is owned by Grupo Radiofónico ZER and carries a romantic music format known as Amor Es (Love Is 104.5).

History
XHDC began as XEDC-AM 1050, with a concession awarded to Radio Vinculación, S.A., on October 29, 1993. It was sold in 2000 and migrated to FM in 2011.

The station had formerly been owned by ACIR outright and carried other formats, including a version of the news format then used on XHM-FM in Mexico City rebadged as "1050 Noticias". Until 2017, XHDC used ACIR's Amor romantic music format, which it dumped in 2017 with a subtle name change to "Amor Es 104.5".

References

External links
Amor es 104.5 Facebook

Radio stations in Aguascalientes